Lac du Bonnet is a town in Manitoba, Canada located  northeast of Winnipeg on the west shore of the Winnipeg River. It is surrounded by the Rural Municipality of Lac du Bonnet. The word "Bonnet" is pronounced by locals as "bonny."

History 
The lake after which Lac du Bonnet takes its name was so called by the French explorer and fur trader Pierre Gaultier La Verendrye, circa 1732. The shape of the lake, itself part of the Winnipeg River, is said to have reminded him of a bonnet. The name "Lac du Bonnet" appears on a map of the explorer Joseph Derouen as early as 1760. 

Beginning in 1926, Lac du Bonnet was home to the #1 Wing of the Royal Canadian Air Force. As a backup communication system to wireless telephone transmitters, aircraft carried pigeons aboard, and as such a pigeon rookery was established on the air force base. RCAF operations in Lac du Bonnet continued until 1937.

Demographics 

Attractions and events 
On the first of July is a yearly Canada Day parade, with fireworks, carnival rides, car show, and bingo. There are also usually many other community-hosted events to attend.

In November, Christmas-themed lighting is set up on the streets, kids can visit Santa, and a Christmas tree is erected.

There are designated snowmobile trails into Lac du Bonnet and specific areas for snowmobile operators to park.

During the weekend in early March the river is dotted with one thousand holes for the local ice fishing derby.

The annual Fire & Water Music Festival takes place on August-long weekend. Artists from across the country come to perform their music.

First airmail flight 
Lac du Bonnet was the location of the first airmail flight in Manitoba, on 4 October 1927.  This event is commemorated with a plaque and marker on the E side of Park Avenue by 3rd Street, next to the parking lot.  According to the plaque, the flight was some 85lbs of mail, taken from here to Bissett and Wadhope.

Media

Newspapers 
Lac du Bonnet Leader, which published its final issue on June 27, 2013
Winnipeg River Echo
Winnipeg River Clipper Weekly

Radio and television 
CBWT-2 first went on the air on May 27, 1968. In early 1969 the province-wide microwave system replaced the kine recordings and citizens of Lac Du Bonnet have had live television since then.

 CBWT-2 Channel 4 (CBC)
 CICA Channel 44 (TVO)

References

External links 

 Official site for Lac du Bonnet

Towns in Manitoba
Hudson's Bay Company trading posts
Urban municipalities in Eastman Region, Manitoba